Eastern Professional Hockey League has been the name of two professional ice hockey leagues:

Eastern Professional Hockey League (1914–1915) - an ice hockey league that took the place of the Maritime Professional Hockey League in 1914.
Eastern Professional Hockey League (1959–1963) - an ice hockey league that played from 1959 to 1963.
Eastern Professional Hockey League (2008–2009) - an ice hockey league beginning play in 2008.